The Avaz Twist Tower is a 40 story, 172m tall skyscraper in Sarajevo, Bosnia and Herzegovina. It is the headquarters for Dnevni avaz, a Bosnian newspaper company. The tower is located in the Marijin Dvor city neighborhood, Sarajevo's central municipality. Construction began in 2006 and was finished two years later in 2008. The tower is notable for its twisted facade. From 2008 until 2021, it was the tallest skyscraper in the former Yugoslavia. In 2009, famous German company Schuco chose the tower amongst the 10 most beautiful buildings in the world.

See also
List of twisted buildings

References

External links

Official Page of the Tower
Dnevni Avaz's Portal
Avaz Twist Tower at Sarajevo-construction
Avaz Twist Tower at skyscrapernews.com

Buildings and structures in Sarajevo
Skyscraper office buildings in Bosnia and Herzegovina
Centar, Sarajevo
Office buildings in Bosnia and Herzegovina
Architecture in Bosnia and Herzegovina
Postmodern architecture
Twisted buildings and structures
Office buildings completed in 2008
2008 establishments in Bosnia and Herzegovina